The Old Man & the Gun is a 2018 American biographical crime film written and directed by David Lowery, about Forrest Tucker, a career criminal and prison escape artist. The script is loosely based on David Grann's 2003 article in The New Yorker titled "The Old Man and the Gun", which was later collected in Grann's 2010 book The Devil and Sherlock Holmes. The film stars Robert Redford, Casey Affleck, Danny Glover, Tika Sumpter, Tom Waits and Sissy Spacek. Redford, then 82-years-old, announced his intent to retire from acting after completion of the film (his only live-action appearance since, a small role in Avengers: Endgame, was filmed before he made The Old Man & the Gun).

The film had its world premiere at the Telluride Film Festival on August 31, 2018, and was theatrically released in the United States by Fox Searchlight Pictures on September 28, 2018. It received mostly positive reviews from critics, and Redford was nominated for Best Actor – Motion Picture Musical or Comedy at the 76th Golden Globe Awards.

Plot
Career criminal Forrest Tucker, a wanted man for two years since his daring escape from San Quentin State Prison in 1979, has just robbed another bank. While evading police, the 74-year-old charmer passes a woman on the side of the road with car trouble and stops to give the appearance of assisting. The ploy works as, moments later, the police drive by without noticing him. The woman, Jewel, who is grateful for his help, buys Forrest lunch at a diner. Despite introducing himself with a fake name, Forrest becomes drawn to Jewel to the point of revealing that he is a bank robber. The two later spend time together on Jewel's farm where Forrest becomes enamored of her and her life. Forrest makes a plan to pay off the rest of Jewel's mortgage as a surprise, but becomes frustrated after the bank tells him that this would require Jewel's signature on some documents, negating any surprise.

Forrest goes on to conduct a string of heists, often without having to draw his gun from under his coat. Dallas Police Detective John Hunt compiles police sketches from witnesses, who describe Forrest as charming and gentlemanly. John then displays the sketches on the evening news, asking anyone with information to come forward. Shortly afterward, John's investigation is taken over by the FBI.

A woman named Dorothy comes forward stating that she is Forrest's daughter. Although he is no longer on the case, John agrees to meet with her. Dorothy says she was born while Forrest was in prison, making him unaware of her or his grandchild. John then talks to Forrest's former lawyer, who says he would not be surprised if Forrest had never pulled the trigger of his gun. According to the lawyer, police reports of Forrest firing during a standoff are false, as it was simply his car's engine backfiring. Later, during a night out with Jewel, Forrest happens to recognize John, who is with his wife Maureen. Forrest tries to boost John's confidence, but becomes unnerved when John calls him by his name, indicating the recognition is mutual.

Later that evening, police attempt to capture Forrest as he arrives home. He flees, but again his car backfires, prompting police to shoot at him, striking him in the arm. He eludes them and makes his way to Jewel's farm. As he arrives in the early hours of the morning, he decides not to wake Jewel and instead takes one of her horses for a ride. Forrest had never ridden a horse before, and this was on his list of things he wanted to do. While riding, several police vehicles come down the road and turn onto Jewel's property. Forrest resigns himself to surrendering and does so. When Jewel visits him in prison, Forrest gives her a list of his sixteen previous escapes from reformatories and prisons, along with a number seventeen, which is blank. On Jewel's advice, he does not try to escape this time and remains incarcerated until the end of his sentence.

When Forrest is released from prison, Jewel is there to pick him up. She takes him to her farm and sets up a room for him, telling him that he can stay as long as he likes. They live a quiet life for a time, but Forrest becomes restless, and one day he tells Jewel that he is going out on an errand. He calls John from a payphone, and, when John asks if he is alright, Forrest says he is "about to be" and hangs up before walking into a bank across the street. Title cards appear that state: "Forrest Tucker robbed four more banks that day. When he was finally caught, the officers on the scene noted that as they arrested him...he was smiling."

Cast

Lowery's wife, filmmaker and actress Augustine Frizzell, plays the small role of Sandy, the woman whose car Forrest steals; Frizzell had played a similar part in Lowery's 2013 film Ain't Them Bodies Saints. Isiah Whitlock, Jr. appears as Detective Gene Dentler, who gives John some information about the case; Whitlock had played a character named Sheriff Gene Dentler in Lowery's 2016 film Pete's Dragon. John Wayne Hunt, the inspiration for Affleck's character, has a cameo in the film as Trustee Jim, an inmate at San Quentin State Prison.

Production
In October 2016, it was announced that Robert Redford and Casey Affleck were slated to star in the film, which David Lowery would direct from his script. James D. Stern, Jeremy Steckler, Dawn Ostroff, Redford, Anthony Mastromauro, and Bill Holderman were set to serve as producers under their Endgame Entertainment and Condé Nast banners, respectively, and Rocket Science was said to be handling international sales. Tika Sumpter, Sissy Spacek, Danny Glover, Tom Waits, Elisabeth Moss, and Isiah Whitlock, Jr. joined the cast of the film in March 2017, and the casting of Keith Carradine was announced the following month.

The film was shot on Super 16 mm film. Principal photography began in Dayton, Ohio, on April 3, 2017. Several scenes were also shot on location in Fort Worth, Texas, to give the film an “authentically Texan” atmosphere, according to Lowery. Filming also took place in Cincinnati and Bethel, Ohio; Bellmead and Waco, Texas; and Newport, Kentucky.

Daniel Hart, who had worked with writer/director Lowery on three previous films, composed the film's score. A soundtrack album featuring his music, along with some of the other songs featured in the film, was released on Varese Sarabande Records.

Release
In March 2017, Fox Searchlight Pictures acquired distribution rights to the film in the US and UK. It had its world premiere at the Telluride Film Festival on August 31, 2018, and was screened at the Toronto International Film Festival on September 10. The film was scheduled to be released on October 5, 2018, but it was pushed up to September 28.

Home media
20th Century Fox Home Entertainment released the film in the United States for digital download on January 1, 2019, and on DVD and Blu-ray on January 15. It was made available via digital download, VOD, and DVD in the UK on April 1. The DVD and Blu-ray releases have eight special features, which include deleted scenes, an audio commentary by Lowery, behind-the-scenes footage, and a conversation about filmmaking between Redford and Lowery.

Reception

Box office
The film was given a limited release in North America on September 28, 2018, and a wide release October 9, and it grossed a total of $11.3 million in the territory. It was released on December 7, 2018, in the United Kingdom, where it grossed $791,192, and on December 20, 2018, in Italy, where it grossed $1.4 million.

Critical response
On Metacritic, the film has a weighted average score of 80 out of 100, based on 49 critics, indicating "generally favorable reviews".

Clint Worthington of Consequence of Sound gave the film a "B+" grade, saying: "Just like Tucker can't help but chase the thrill of an outlaw's life, so too the audience gets hooked on Redford's effortless presence, and the airy, ethereal joys the film presents." Todd McCarthy of The Hollywood Reporter wrote: "The film makes plenty of mileage from trading on the charm of a good bad boy, and Redford's long experience in playing such roles serves him beautifully here; he knows by now he doesn't have to push his attractiveness to be ingratiating." Peter Debruge of Variety described the film as "a reminder of everything Redford has given us over the years," and Eric Kohn of IndieWire gave the film a "B+" grade, saying: "Ultimately, the movie is a giant, lovable metaphor: Tucker's criminal preoccupations are such a natural part of his life he seems as if he could keep at it forever, no matter the impracticalities, and he becomes an ideal avatar for Redford's own achievements."

Accolades

Notes

References

External links
 
 
 
 
 

2018 films
2010s biographical films
2018 crime films
American biographical films
American crime films
Films directed by David Lowery
Films scored by Daniel Hart
Films set in California
Films set in Texas
Films shot in Ohio
Fox Searchlight Pictures films
Rocket Science films
Endgame Entertainment films
2018 independent films
American heist films
Films set in 1981
Films set in 1999
Biographical films about criminals
Films based on newspaper and magazine articles
2010s English-language films
2010s American films
Films shot in Cincinnati